Morpheridine (Morpholinoethylnorpethidine) is a 4-phenylpiperidine derivative that is related to the clinically used opioid analgesic drug pethidine (meperidine). It is a strong analgesic with around 4 times the potency of pethidine, and unlike pethidine, does not cause convulsions, although it produces the standard opioid side effects such as sedation and respiratory depression.

Morpheridine is not currently used in medicine and is a Schedule I drug which is controlled under UN drug conventions.

Synthesis

The key intermediate, normeperidine, is obtained by a scheme closely akin to the parent molecule. Thus, alkylation of benzyl cyanide (1) with the tosyl analog of the bischloroethylamine (2) leads to the substituted piperidine (3). Basic hydrolysis serves to convert the nitrile to the acid (4). Treatment of this last with sulfuric acid in ethanol serves both to esterify the acid and to remove the tosyl group to yield the secondary amine (5).

Alkylation of that amine by means of N-(2-chloroethyl)morpholine gives morpheridine.

See also 
Anileridine
Furethidine
Carbetidine

References 

4-Phenylpiperidines
Analgesics
Ethyl esters
4-Morpholinyl compunds
Mu-opioid receptor agonists
Synthetic opioids